Hayden Mexted (born 10 March 1979 in Whakatane) is a former New Zealand-born American rugby union lock. He was a member of the United States national rugby union team that participated in the 2007 Rugby World Cup.
He is a distant cousin of Murray Mexted. He was also capable of playing number 8, much like his cousin.

References

1979 births
Living people
Rugby union props
American rugby union players
United States international rugby union players
Rugby union players from Whakatāne
American people of New Zealand descent